Emma Jensen (born 25 November 1977) is rugby union player for  and Auckland. She was a member of three successful Rugby World Cup campaigns in 2002, 2006, and 2010.

Jensen scored 20 points in her sides semifinal win against France at the 2006 Rugby World Cup.

Jensen was named in the 2014 Women's Rugby World Cup squad. In 2015, she made the squad to tour Canada for the inaugural Women's Rugby Super Series. Between 2002 and 2015, she made 49 test appearances for the Black Ferns.

References

External links
Black Ferns Profile

1977 births
Living people
New Zealand women's international rugby union players
New Zealand female rugby union players
Rugby union scrum-halves
Auckland rugby union players
Waikato rugby union players
Hawke's Bay rugby union players